The Annotated Turing: A Guided Tour Through Alan Turing’s Historic Paper on Computability and the Turing Machine is a book by Charles Petzold, published in 2008 by John Wiley & Sons, Inc.

Petzold annotates Alan Turing's paper "On Computable Numbers, with an Application to the Entscheidungsproblem". The book takes readers sentence by sentence through Turing's paper, providing explanations, further examples, corrections, and biographical information.

Table of contents
 Part I. Foundations
 Chapter 1: This Tomb Holds Diophantus
 Chapter 2: The Irrational and the Transcendental
 Chapter 3: Centuries of Progress
 Part II. Computable Numbers
 Chapter 4: The Education of Alan Turing
 Chapter 5: Machines at Work
 Chapter 6: Addition and Multiplication
 Chapter 7: Also Known as Subroutines
 Chapter 8: Everything is a Number
 Chapter 9: The Universal Machine
 Chapter 10: Computers and Computability
 Chapter 11: Of Machines and Men
 Part III. Das Entscheidungsproblem
 Chapter 12: Logic and Computability
 Chapter 13: Computable Functions
 Chapter 14: The Major Proof
 Chapter 15: The Lambda Calculus
 Chapter 16: Conceiving the Continuum 
 Part IV. And Beyond
 Chapter 17: Is Everything a Turing Machine?
 Chapter 18: The Long Sleep of Diophantus

See also
 Alan Turing: The Enigma (1983)
 The Turing Guide (2017)

References

External links
 Book website
 Q&A with Mr Charles Petzold 2-2013 vNextOC from YouTube

2008 non-fiction books
Mathematics books
Wiley (publisher) books
Alan Turing